Retriever is the eighth studio album from Canadian singer-songwriter Ron Sexsmith.

Track listing

All songs written by Ronald Eldon Sexsmith.

 "Hard Bargain" – 3:13
 "Imaginary Friends" – 3:42
 "Not About to Lose" – 3:00
 "Tomorrow in Her Eyes" – 2:29
 "From Now On" – 4:39
 "For the Driver" – 2:47
 "Wishing Wells" – 4:08
 "Whatever It Takes" – 3:21
 "Dandelion Wine" – 3:29
 "Happiness" – 2:32
 "How on Earth" – 4:10
 "I Know It Well" – 2:39

Cover versions

The Art Of Time Ensemble featuring Sarah Slean recorded "Dandelion Wine" on their 2009 album Black Flowers.

References

2004 albums
Nettwerk Records albums
Ron Sexsmith albums